Razbliuto! is the debut album of South African glitch-electronica band Lark. It was produced by Paul Ressel, and released in August 2006 on Just Music. The album art was designed by Nigel Moore, with sleeve photography by Natasja Fourie.

Reception
The album received much praise from critics, and won Best Alternative Album at the 13th South African Music Awards in 2007. The music critic, Marcus Louw, remarked that the album's strength "lies in the way in which Lark manage to be quite adventurous and experimental while still remaining accessible". In the Cape Argus, Evan Milton described the album as "densely layered and delectably dark" The American podcast, Nonstuff, proclaimed that "Lark’s presence in Cape Town is certain to make us take notice".

Track listing

Personnel 
Band members
 Inge Beckmann - vocals, vocal FX
 Paul Ressel - sequencing, synth, piano, guitar and harpsichord
 Simon Ratcliffe -  electric bass, double bass and duduk
 Sean Ou Tim - drums, percussion

Session musicians
 Paula Masterson - clarinet, string arrangements
 David Shapiro - mandola
 Micky Wiswedel - synth
 Lara Block - cello
 Andre Jansen van Rensberg - accordion
 Kyla-Rose Smith - violin
 Rayelle Goodman - violin

Album Name 
The album's name is a reference to a long-running hoax of a Russian word, that purportedly cannot be translated into the English language. In reality this word does not exist in the Russian language.

References

Lark (band) albums
2006 debut albums